Patrick B. Haddon (born September 15, 1977) is an American politician. He is a member of the South Carolina House of Representatives from the 19th District, serving since 2019. He is a member of the Republican party.

Haddon is a member of the South Carolina Freedom Caucus.  He is Chair of the House Operations and Management Committee.

In 2023, Haddon was briefly among the Republican co-sponsors of the South Carolina Prenatal Equal Protection Act of 2023, which would make women who had abortions eligible for the death penalty; he later withdrew his sponsorship.

References

Living people
1977 births
Republican Party members of the South Carolina House of Representatives
21st-century American politicians